The Very Best of Aretha Franklin, Vol. 1 is a compilation album by singer Aretha Franklin, released by Rhino Records in March 1994. The album compiles 13 of her first 14 singles for Atlantic Records all of which were recorded during the 1960s. The original recordings were produced by Jerry Wexler, and this compilation was certified platinum by the RIAA.

Content
This compilation contains thirteen of Franklin's initial fourteen singles released in the United States on Atlantic from her debut "I Never Loved a Man (The Way I Love You)" of February 1967 through "Call Me" of January 1970. The first eight all made the top ten on the Billboard Hot 100, including her chart-topping signature song, "Respect." No single included charted lower than No. 19 on the Hot 100. Missing is her eleventh single of this sequence, "I Can't See Myself Leaving You" of April 1969; also missing is her 1968 version of "(I Can't Get No) Satisfaction" released as a single in the United Kingdom only.

The other three tracks appeared as b-sides, two of which charted on the Hot 100 independently of their hit sides. The single mixes do not appear here on every track.

All basic tracks were recorded at FAME Studios in Muscle Shoals, Alabama, with the studio's core session musicians. Additional overdubbing on select recordings took place at Atlantic Studios in New York City.

Track listing

Collective personnel
Aretha Franklin — vocals, piano
Bernie Glow, Wayne Jackson, Melvin Lastie, Joe Newman — trumpets
Tony Studd — bass trombone
Charles Chalmers, King Curtis, Andrew Love, Seldon Powell, Frank Wess — tenor saxophone
Willie Bridges, Haywood Henry — baritone saxophone
Barry Beckett, Spooner Oldham — keyboards
Duane Allman, Eddie Hinton, Jimmy Johnson, Chips Moman, Joe South — guitars
Tommy Cogbill, David Hood, Jerry Jemmott — bass
Gene Chrisman, Roger Hawkins — drums
Carolyn Franklin, Erma Franklin, Ellie Greenwich, Cissy Houston, The Sweet Inspirations — backing vocals

Charts

Certifications

References

Aretha Franklin compilation albums
1994 compilation albums
Rhino Records albums